The 1979-80 NBA season was the Lakers' 32nd season in the NBA and the 20th season in Los Angeles. It featured a 20-year old rookie Magic Johnson leading the Lakers to their seventh NBA Championship (second in Los Angeles), defeating the Philadelphia 76ers led by Julius Erving in six games in the NBA Finals. This was also the team's first season under the ownership of Jerry Buss. Magic's season represented the birth of the Showtime Lakers.

Offseason

NBA Draft

Roster

Regular season

Season standings

Record vs. opponents

Season schedule

|- align="center" bgcolor="#ccffcc"
| 1
| October 12, 1979
| @ San Diego
| W 103–102
|
|
|
| San Diego Sports Arena
| 1–0
|- align="center" bgcolor="#ccffcc"
| 2
| October 16, 1979
| Chicago
| W 105–96
|
|
|
| The Forum
| 2–0
|- align="center" bgcolor="#ffcccc"
| 3
| October 17, 1979
| @ Seattle
| L 110–112
|
|
|
| Kingdome
| 2–1
|- align="center" bgcolor="#ffcccc"
| 4
| October 19, 1979
| Portland
| L 82–99
|
|
|
| The Forum
| 2–2
|- align="center" bgcolor="#ccffcc"
| 5
| October 21, 1979
| Seattle
| W 106–97
|
|
|
| The Forum
| 3–2
|- align="center" bgcolor="#ccffcc"
| 6
| October 23, 1979
| Utah
| W 102–87
|
|
|
| The Forum
| 4–2
|- align="center" bgcolor="#ccffcc"
| 7
| October 26, 1979
| Kansas City
| W 116–104
|
|
|
| The Forum
| 5–2
|- align="center" bgcolor="#ccffcc"
| 8
| October 28, 1979
| Golden State
| W 97–90
|
|
|
| The Forum
| 6–2
|- align="center" bgcolor="#ccffcc"
| 9
| October 30, 1979
| @ Chicago
| W 111–105
|
|
|
| Chicago Stadium
| 7–2
|- align="center" bgcolor="#ffcccc"
| 10
| October 31, 1979
| @ Milwaukee
| L 106–110
|
|
|
| MECCA Arena
| 7–3

|- align="center" bgcolor="#ccffcc"
| 11
| November 2, 1979
| Phoenix
| W 112–110
|
|
|
| The Forum
| 8–3
|- align="center" bgcolor="#ccffcc"
| 12
| November 6, 1979
| San Diego
| W 127–112
|
|
|
| The Forum
| 9–3
|- align="center" bgcolor="#ffcccc"
| 13
| November 7, 1979
| @ Golden State
| L 109–126
|
|
|
| Oakland-Alameda County Coliseum Arena
| 9–4
|- align="center" bgcolor="#ccffcc"
| 14
| November 9, 1979
| Denver
| W 126–122 (OT)
|
|
|
| The Forum
| 10–4
|- align="center" bgcolor="#ccffcc"
| 15
| November 11, 1979
| Cleveland
| W 140–126
|
|
|
| The Forum
| 11–4
|- align="center" bgcolor="#ccffcc"
| 16
| November 13, 1979
| @ San Diego
| W 137–91
|
|
|
| San Diego Sports Arena
| 12–4
|- align="center" bgcolor="#ffcccc"
| 17
| November 15, 1979
| @ Kansas City
| L 108–114
|
|
|
| Municipal Auditorium
| 12–5
|- align="center" bgcolor="#ccffcc"
| 18
| November 16, 1979
| @ Denver
| W 135–128 (OT)
|
|
|
| McNichols Sports Arena
| 13–5
|- align="center" bgcolor="#ccffcc"
| 19
| November 18, 1979
| Indiana
| W 127–104
|
|
|
| The Forum
| 14–5
|- align="center" bgcolor="#ffcccc"
| 20
| November 20, 1979
| @ Portland
| L 99–114
|
|
|
| Memorial Coliseum
| 14–6
|- align="center" bgcolor="#ffcccc"
| 21
| November 21, 1979
| @ Seattle
| L 110–119
|
|
|
| Kingdome
| 14–7
|- align="center" bgcolor="#ffcccc"
| 22
| November 23, 1979
| @ Phoenix
| L 112–126
|
|
|
| Arizona Veterans Memorial Coliseum
| 14–8
|- align="center" bgcolor="#ccffcc"
| 23
| November 25, 1979
| Kansas City
| W 111–110
|
|
|
| The Forum
| 15–8
|- align="center" bgcolor="#ccffcc"
| 24
| November 27, 1979
| @ Utah
| W 122–118
|
|
|
| Salt Palace
| 16–8
|- align="center" bgcolor="#ffcccc"
| 25
| November 30, 1979
| Chicago
| L 100–107
|
|
|
| The Forum
| 16–9

|- align="center" bgcolor="#ccffcc"
| 26
| December 2, 1979
| Milwaukee
| W 116–103
|
|
|
| The Forum
| 17–9
|- align="center" bgcolor="#ccffcc"
| 27
| December 4, 1979
| @ San Antonio
| W 127–121
|
|
|
| HemisFair Arena
| 18–9
|- align="center" bgcolor="#ccffcc"
| 28
| December 5, 1979
| @ Houston
| W 116–114
|
|
|
| The Summit
| 19–9
|- align="center" bgcolor="#ffcccc"
| 29
| December 7, 1979
| San Diego
| L 108–116
|
|
|
| The Forum
| 19–10
|- align="center" bgcolor="#ccffcc"
| 30
| December 9, 1979
| Denver
| W 131–118
|
|
|
| The Forum
| 20–10
|- align="center" bgcolor="#ccffcc"
| 31
| December 14, 1979
| Detroit
| W 138–122
|
|
|
| The Forum
| 21–10
|- align="center" bgcolor="#ccffcc"
| 32
| December 16, 1979
| San Antonio
| W 121–119
|
|
|
| The Forum
| 22–10
|- align="center" bgcolor="#ccffcc"
| 33
| December 18, 1979
| @ Chicago
| W 129–118
|
|
|
| Chicago Stadium
| 23–10
|- align="center" bgcolor="#ffcccc"
| 34
| December 19, 1979
| @ Atlanta
| L 112–119
|
|
|
| The Omni
| 23–11
|- align="center" bgcolor="#ccffcc"
| 35
| December 21, 1979
| Golden State
| W 114–108
|
|
|
| The Forum
| 24–11
|- align="center" bgcolor="#ffcccc"
| 36
| December 22, 1979
| @ Denver
| L 128–130
|
|
|
| McNichols Sports Arena
| 24–12
|- align="center" bgcolor="#ccffcc"
| 37
| December 23, 1979
| Seattle
| W 102–97
|
|
|
| The Forum
| 25–12
|- align="center" bgcolor="#ffcccc"
| 38
| December 26, 1979
| @ Kansas City
| L 111–118
|
|
|
| Municipal Auditorium
| 25–13
|- align="center" bgcolor="#ccffcc"
| 39
| December 27, 1979
| @ Utah
| W 124–116
|
|
|
| Salt Palace
| 26–13
|- align="center" bgcolor="#ccffcc"
| 40
| December 28, 1979
| Boston
| W 123–105
|
|
|
| The Forum
| 27–13
|- align="center" bgcolor="#ccffcc"
| 41
| December 30, 1979
| Phoenix
| W 113–105
|
|
|
| The Forum
| 28–13

|- align="center" bgcolor="#ccffcc"
| 42
| January 2, 1980
| @ Indiana
| W 127–120
|
|
|
| Market Square Arena
| 29–13
|- align="center" bgcolor="#ffcccc"
| 43
| January 6, 1980
| @ Milwaukee
| L 103–113
|
|
|
| MECCA Arena
| 29–14
|- align="center" bgcolor="#ffcccc"
| 44
| January 9, 1980
| @ Washington
| L 101–103
|
|
|
| Capital Centre
| 29–15
|- align="center" bgcolor="#ccffcc"
| 45
| January 11, 1980
| @ Detroit
| W 123–100
|
|
|
| Pontiac Silverdome
| 30–15
|- align="center" bgcolor="#ccffcc"
| 46
| January 13, 1980
| @ Boston
| W 100–98
|
|
|
| Boston Garden
| 31–15
|- align="center" bgcolor="#ccffcc"
| 47
| January 15, 1980
| Utah
| W 112–99
|
|
|
| The Forum
| 32–15
|- align="center" bgcolor="#ccffcc"
| 48
| January 16, 1980
| @ Golden State
| W 97–96
|
|
|
| Oakland-Alameda County Coliseum Arena
| 33–15
|- align="center" bgcolor="#ccffcc"
| 49
| January 18, 1980
| Atlanta
| W 108–102
|
|
|
| The Forum
| 34–15
|- align="center" bgcolor="#ccffcc"
| 50
| January 21, 1980
| New York
| W 132–114
|
|
|
| The Forum
| 35–15
|- align="center" bgcolor="#ffcccc"
| 51
| January 24, 1980
| @ Portland
| L 103–111
|
|
|
| Memorial Coliseum
| 35–16
|- align="center" bgcolor="#ccffcc"
| 52
| January 25, 1980
| Philadelphia
| W 124–103
|
|
|
| The Forum
| 36–16
|- align="center" bgcolor="#ccffcc"
| 53
| January 27, 1980
| Milwaukee
| W 112–102
|
|
|
| The Forum
| 37–16
|- align="center" bgcolor="#ffcccc"
| 54
| January 29, 1980
| @ Cleveland
| L 153–154 (4 OT)
|
|
|
| Richfield Coliseum
| 37–17
|- align="center" bgcolor="#ccffcc"
| 55
| January 31, 1980
| @ Chicago
| W 107–97
|
|
|
| Chicago Stadium
| 38–17

|- align="center"
|colspan="9" bgcolor="#bbcaff"|All-Star Break
|- style="background:#cfc;"
|- bgcolor="#bbffbb"
|- align="center" bgcolor="#ccffcc"
| 56
| February 5, 1980
| @ New York
| W 116–105
|
|
|
| Madison Square Garden
| 39–17
|- align="center" bgcolor="#ccffcc"
| 57
| February 8, 1980
| @ New Jersey
| W 125–120 (OT)
|
|
|
| Rutgers Athletic Center
| 40–17
|- align="center" bgcolor="#ffcccc"
| 58
| February 10, 1980
| @ Philadelphia
| L 104–105 
|
|
|
| The Spectrum
| 40–18
|- align="center" bgcolor="#ccffcc"
| 59
| February 13, 1980
| Portland
| W 129–100
|
|
|
| The Forum
| 41–18
|- align="center" bgcolor="#ccffcc"
| 60
| February 15, 1980
| Kansas City
| W 114–100
|
|
|
| The Forum
| 42–18
|- align="center" bgcolor="#ccffcc"
| 61
| February 17, 1980
| Washington
| W 111–107
|
|
|
| The Forum
| 43–18
|- align="center" bgcolor="#ccffcc"
| 62
| February 20, 1980
| @ Denver
| W 116–103
|
|
|
| McNichols Sports Arena
| 44–18
|- align="center" bgcolor="#ccffcc"
| 63
| February 22, 1980
| New Jersey
| W 132–110
|
|
|
| The Forum
| 45–18
|- align="center" bgcolor="#ccffcc"
| 64
| February 24, 1980
| Houston
| W 112–100
|
|
|
| The Forum
| 46–18
|- align="center" bgcolor="#ccffcc"
| 65
| February 26, 1980
| Seattle
| W 131–108
|
|
|
| The Forum
| 47–18
|- align="center" bgcolor="#ffcccc"
| 66
| February 29, 1980
| Milwaukee
| L 117–126 (OT)
|
|
|
| The Forum
| 47–19

|- align="center" bgcolor="#ffcccc"
| 67
| March 2, 1980
| @ Phoenix
| L 115–123
|
|
|
| Arizona Veterans Memorial Coliseum
| 47–20
|- align="center" bgcolor="#ccffcc"
| 68
| March 4, 1980
| @ Milwaukee
| W 127–124
|
|
|
| MECCA Arena
| 48–20
|- align="center" bgcolor="#ccffcc"
| 69
| March 5, 1980
| @ Kansas City
| W 117–101
|
|
|
| Kemper Arena
| 49–20
|- align="center" bgcolor="#ccffcc"
| 70
| March 7, 1980
| Chicago
| W 101–99
|
|
|
| The Forum
| 50–20
|- align="center" bgcolor="#ffcccc"
| 71
| March 9, 1980
| @ Portland
| L 121–142
|
|
|
| Memorial Coliseum
| 50–21
|- align="center" bgcolor="#ccffcc"
| 72
| March 11, 1980
| @ San Diego
| W 123–106
|
|
|
| San Diego Sports Arena
| 51–21
|- align="center" bgcolor="#ccffcc"
| 73
| March 12, 1980
| Portland
| W 102–94
|
|
|
| The Forum
| 52–21
|- align="center" bgcolor="#ccffcc"
| 74
| March 14, 1980
| Denver
| W 132–126
|
|
|
| The Forum
| 53–21
|- align="center" bgcolor="#ccffcc"
| 75
| March 16, 1980
| Phoenix
| W 128–106
|
|
|
| The Forum
| 54–21
|- align="center" bgcolor="#ccffcc"
| 76
| March 18, 1980
| Golden State
| W 118–100
|
|
|
| The Forum
| 55–21
|- align="center" bgcolor="#ffcccc"
| 77
| March 19, 1980
| @ Phoenix
| L 108–112
|
|
|
| Arizona Veterans Memorial Coliseum
| 55–22
|- align="center" bgcolor="#ccffcc"
| 78
| March 22, 1980
| @ Seattle
| W 97–92
|
|
|
| Kingdome
| 56–22
|- align="center" bgcolor="#ccffcc"
| 79
| March 23, 1980
| Utah
| W 101–96
|
|
|
| The Forum
| 57–22
|- align="center" bgcolor="#ccffcc"
| 80
| March 27, 1980
| @ Utah
| W 97–95
|
|
|
| Salt Palace
| 58–22
|- align="center" bgcolor="#ccffcc"
| 81
| March 28, 1980
| San Diego
| W 126–88
|
|
|
| The Forum
| 59–22
|- align="center" bgcolor="#ccffcc"
| 82
| March 30, 1980
| @ Golden State
| W 95–93
|
|
|
| Oakland-Alameda County Coliseum Arena
| 60–22

Playoffs

|- align="center" bgcolor="#ccffcc"
| 1
| April 8, 1980
| Phoenix
| W 119–110
| Kareem Abdul-Jabbar (30)
| Abdul-Jabbar, Johnson (12)
| Magic Johnson (16)
| The Forum15,892
| 1–0
|- align="center" bgcolor="#ccffcc"
| 2
| April 9, 1980
| Phoenix
| W 131–128 (OT)
| Kareem Abdul-Jabbar (32)
| Magic Johnson (13)
| Norm Nixon (12)
| The Forum14,286
| 2–0
|- align="center" bgcolor="#ccffcc"
| 3
| April 11, 1980
| @ Phoenix
| W 108–105
| Kareem Abdul-Jabbar (37)
| Magic Johnson (13)
| Norm Nixon (8)
| Arizona Veterans Memorial Coliseum12,660
| 3–0
|- align="center" bgcolor="#ffcccc"
| 4
| April 13, 1980
| @ Phoenix
| L 101–127
| Kareem Abdul-Jabbar (25)
| Kareem Abdul-Jabbar (11)
| Magic Johnson (13)
| Arizona Veterans Memorial Coliseum12,660
| 3–1
|- align="center" bgcolor="#ccffcc"
| 5
| April 15, 1980
| Phoenix
| W 126–101
| Kareem Abdul-Jabbar (35)
| Kareem Abdul-Jabbar (16)
| Norm Nixon (13)
| The Forum17,505
| 4–1
|-

|- align="center" bgcolor="#ffcccc"
| 1
| April 22, 1980
| Seattle
| L 107–108
| Kareem Abdul-Jabbar (26)
| three players tied (8)
| Norm Nixon (11)
| The Forum17,505
| 0–1
|- align="center" bgcolor="#ccffcc"
| 2
| April 23, 1980
| Seattle
| W 108–99
| Kareem Abdul-Jabbar (31)
| Kareem Abdul-Jabbar (16)
| Norm Nixon (12)
| The Forum17,505
| 1–1
|- align="center" bgcolor="#ccffcc"
| 3
| April 25, 1980
| @ Seattle
| W 104–100
| Kareem Abdul-Jabbar (33)
| Kareem Abdul-Jabbar (13)
| Johnson, Cooper (10)
| Hec Edmundson Pavilion8,524
| 2–1
|- align="center" bgcolor="#ccffcc"
| 4
| April 27, 1980
| @ Seattle
| W 98–93
| Kareem Abdul-Jabbar (25)
| Wilkes, Johnson (13)
| Norm Nixon (8)
| Hec Edmundson Pavilion8,524
| 3–1
|- align="center" bgcolor="#ccffcc"
| 5
| April 30, 1980
| Seattle
| W 111–105
| Kareem Abdul-Jabbar (38)
| Kareem Abdul-Jabbar (11)
| Magic Johnson (10)
| The Forum17,505
| 4–1
|-

|- align="center" bgcolor="#ccffcc"
| 1
| May 4, 1980
| Philadelphia
| W 109–102
| Kareem Abdul-Jabbar (33)
| Kareem Abdul-Jabbar (14)
| Magic Johnson (10)
| The Forum17,505
| 1–0
|- align="center" bgcolor="#ffcccc"
| 2
| May 7, 1980
| Philadelphia
| L 104–107
| Kareem Abdul-Jabbar (38)
| Kareem Abdul-Jabbar (14)
| Magic Johnson (11)
| The Forum17,505
| 1–1
|- align="center" bgcolor="#ccffcc"
| 3
| May 10, 1980
| @ Philadelphia
| W 111–101
| Kareem Abdul-Jabbar (33)
| Kareem Abdul-Jabbar (14)
| Norm Nixon (7)
| The Spectrum18,726
| 2–1
|- align="center" bgcolor="#ffcccc"
| 4
| May 11, 1980
| @ Philadelphia
| L 102–105
| Magic Johnson (28)
| Kareem Abdul-Jabbar (11)
| Magic Johnson (9)
| The Spectrum18,726
| 2–2
|- align="center" bgcolor="#ccffcc"
| 5
| May 14, 1980
| Philadelphia
| W 108–103
| Kareem Abdul-Jabbar (40)
| Abdul-Jabbar, Johnson (15)
| Magic Johnson (10)
| The Forum17,505
| 3–2
|- align="center" bgcolor="#ccffcc"
| 6
| May 16, 1980
| @ Philadelphia
| W 123–107
| Magic Johnson (42)
| Magic Johnson (15)
| Norm Nixon (9)
| The Spectrum18,726
| 4–2
|-

Magic Johnson
Having won everything possible at the college level, Johnson decided to leave college two years early and declared himself eligible for the 1979 NBA draft. The New Orleans Jazz originally had the first draft pick, but they had traded the pick to the Los Angeles Lakers in exchange for NBA star Gail Goodrich. As a result, the Lakers drafted Johnson with the first overall pick, signing him for a sizable salary of US$600,000 a year.

Johnson joined a franchise which had gone through major changes. The Lakers featured a new coach in Jack McKinney, a new owner in Jerry Buss, and several new players. However, Johnson was most excited about the prospect of playing with his personal idol, the 7–2 center Kareem Abdul-Jabbar, who would go on to become the leading scorer in NBA history. From the first game, Johnson displayed his trademark enthusiasm for the game. When Abdul-Jabbar hit a last-second free throw line hook shot to win against the San Diego Clippers, Johnson ran around the court, high-fiving and hugging everybody, causing concern that the "Buck" (as Johnson was called by Lakers announcer Chick Hearn for his youth) would burn himself out. However, in that 1979–80 NBA season, the rookie proved them wrong. Johnson introduced an uptempo style of basketball which the NBA described as a mix of "no-look passes off the fastbreak, pinpoint alley-oops from halfcourt, spinning feeds and overhand bullets under the basket through triple teams". Fellow Lakers guard Michael Cooper even stated that: "There have been times when he [Johnson] has thrown passes and I wasn't sure where he was going. Then one of our guys catches the ball and scores, and I run back up the floor convinced that he must've thrown it through somebody." This style of basketball became known as "Showtime". Given Johnson was also a prolific scorer and rebounder, he soon led the league in triple-doubles, racking up 10-points-10-rebounds-10-assists games in a rate only second to NBA Hall-of-Famer Oscar Robertson. In addition, he expressed a raw, childlike enthusiasm which further endeared him to the fans.

Johnson's average of 18.0 points, 7.7 rebounds and 7.3 assists per game was enough to make the All-Rookie Team and become a starter on the All-Star Team, even though the NBA Rookie of the Year Award went to his rival Larry Bird, who had joined the Boston Celtics. The Lakers compiled a 60–22 win–loss record, and with Paul Westhead replacing coach McKinney as a coach after a serious bicycle accident 13 games into the season, the Lakers reached the 1980 NBA Finals against the Philadelphia 76ers. Against the fierce resistance of Sixers Hall-of-Fame forward Julius "Doctor J" Erving and Darryl Dawkins, the Lakers took a 3–2 lead before Abdul-Jabbar went down with a sprained ankle. Coach Westhead decided to put point guard Johnson at pivot instead, and on the Sixers' home court, the rookie dominated with 42 points, 15 rebounds, seven assists and three steals, lifting the Lakers to a 123–107 win and winning the NBA Finals MVP award. The NBA regards Johnson's clutch performance as one of the finest individual games ever. Although only twenty years old, he had already won every trophy at the high school, college and professional levels. Johnson also became one of only four players to win NCAA and NBA championships in consecutive years.

Player statistics

Regular season

*Stats after being traded to the Lakers.
†Stats before being traded from the Lakers.

Playoffs

Awards and records
 Kareem Abdul-Jabbar, NBA Most Valuable Player Award
 Magic Johnson, NBA Finals Most Valuable Player Award
 Kareem Abdul-Jabbar, All-NBA First Team
 Kareem Abdul-Jabbar, NBA All-Defensive First Team
 Kareem Abdul-Jabbar, NBA All-Star Game
 Magic Johnson, NBA All-Star Game
 Magic Johnson, NBA All-Rookie Team 1st Team

References

 Lakers on Database Basketball
 Lakers on Basketball Reference
 

Los Angeles Lakers seasons
NBA championship seasons
Los
Western Conference (NBA) championship seasons
Los Angle
Los Angle